Roller skating and roller hockey were contested at the 1987 Pan American Games, held in Indianapolis, USA.

Roller skating

Men's events
Speed

Artistic

Women's events
Speed

Artistic

Mixed events
Artistic

Roller hockey

Men

Medal table

References

Events at the 1987 Pan American Games
1987
1987 in roller sports